Jefferson Cobb Walker (born July 4, 1845) was a minister, laborer, and state legislator in Mississippi.

He represented Monroe County, Mississippi in the Mississippi House of Representatives in 1874 and 1875.

He was born in Mississippi. He was ordained a Baptist minister in 1882 and presided at Artesia Baptist Church until 1892. He served as vice-president of the Baptist State Convention in 1892.

See also
African-American officeholders during and following the Reconstruction era

References

Year of death missing
1845 births